My Wife's Goblin also known as My Wife's Ghost (translit. Afreet Meraty) is a 1968 Egyptian romantic comedy film directed by Fatin Abdel Wahab.

Cast
 Salah Zulfikar as Saleh
 Shadia as Aida
 Emad Hamdy as Raef
 Adel Emam as Shafai
 Hassan Hussein as Lamei
 Amal Zayed as Aida's mother
 Hassan Mustafa as Hefzy, Saleh's manager at the bank
 Hala Fakher as Inayat, Saleh's sister
 Al-Toukhi Tawfiq as the gang member
 Hussein Ismail as Salama Khadim Raef
 Nabila Al-Sayed as Anisa
 Ibrahim Saafan as Irma Laddus' customer
 Salama Elias as the gang member
 Abbas Rahmi as bank manager
 Sanaa Maher as the bank manager's wife
 Soheir Reda as Hefzy's wife
 Syed Abdullah as Dr. Sami

See also
 Cinema of Egypt
 Lists of Egyptian films
 Salah Zulfikar filmography
 List of Egyptian films of 1968
 List of Egyptian films of the 1960s

References

External links
 
 My Wife's Goblin on elCinema
 “Raw Narrative Walks on Two Feet.” Like a Summer Never to Be Repeated, by Mohamed Berrada and Christina Phillips, American University in Cairo Press, Cairo; New York, 2009, pp. 139–154. JSTOR, www.jstor.org/stable/j.ctt15m7hg7.13. Accessed 7 Sept. 2021.

1960s Arabic-language films
1968 films
1968 romantic comedy films
Egyptian romantic comedy films
Films directed by Fatin Abdel Wahab
Egyptian black-and-white films